William Webbe (by 1499 – 1554), of Salisbury, Wiltshire, was an English politician.

He was a Member (MP) of the Parliament of England for Salisbury in 1529 and 1536.

References

People from Salisbury
15th-century births
1554 deaths
English MPs 1529–1536
English MPs 1536